Lohna may refer to:

 Lohna, Bihar, a village in India
 Lohna, Himachal Pradesh, a village in India